Prettau is a comune (municipality) in South Tyrol, a province in northern Italy, located about  northeast of Bolzano, on the border with Austria.

Geography
It is the northernmost comune of Italy.

Prettau borders the following municipalities: Brandberg (Austria), Sand in Taufers, Krimml (Austria), Prägraten am Großvenediger (Austria), Sankt Jakob in Defereggen (Austria), and Ahrntal.

Society

Linguistic distribution
According to the 2011 census, 97.33% of the population speak German and 2.67% Italian as first language.

Demographic evolution

Bibliography
 Stefan Steinhauser, Eduard Tasser: Prettau – Bilder, Fakten, Geschichten. Prettau 2008 Download (25 MB)

References

External links

 Homepage of the municipality

Municipalities of South Tyrol
Rieserferner-Ahrn Nature Park